Founded in 1846, the Galveston County Bar Association is a voluntary association of attorneys practicing in Galveston County, Texas.

Officers of the Organization
Kelly Haas, President
Melody Poole, President-Elect
Candace Freeman, Secretary
Kevin Cochran, Treasurer
Judge John Grady, Director
Jarrod Robinson, Director
Michelle Bassett, Director
Jonathan Zendeh Del, Director

References

Galveston County, Texas
Organizations based in Texas